European Film Award for Best Film is one of the annual European Film Awards, presented by the European Film Academy to recognize the best in European filmmaking. It was first awarded in 1988 with Polish film A Short Film About Killing, directed by Krzysztof Kieślowski, being the first recipient of the award.

Directors Gianni Amelio, Lars von Trier and Michael Haneke have received the most wins in this category with three wins each, while Pedro Almodóvar is the most nominated director with seven nominations, winning twice. Maren Ade was the first female director to win the award, receiving it for Toni Erdmann in 2016.

Winners and nominees

1980s

1990s

2000s

2010s

2020s

Record holders

References

External links
 Nominees and winners  at the European Film Academy website

Film
European Film Award
Awards established in 1988
1988 establishments in Europe